Christodoulopoulos is a Greek surname with the female form being Christodoulopoulou. It is the surname of:

 Ariana Chris (born 1975 as Ariadni Christodoulopoulou), Greek-Canadian mezzo-soprano.
 Giannis Christodoulopoulos (born 1983), Greek composer.
 Ioannis Christodoulopoulos (1779–1853), Greek revolutionary.
 Lazaros Christodoulopoulos (born 1986), Greece national team footballer.
 Makis Christodoulopoulos (born 1948), Greek singer.
 Tasia Christodoulopoulou, Greek politician and government minister.

Greek-language surnames
Surnames